The Amazonian scrub flycatcher or Todd's scrub flycatcher (Sublegatus obscurior) is a species of bird in the family Tyrannidae, the tyrant flycatchers.

Description 
The Amazonian scrub flycatcher can be identified by its gray and white wings, yellow abdomen, gray legs, dark brown bill, and dark gray and brown head. It averages to be about 14 centimeters long and has a round head often raised into a slight crest.

Habitat 
The Amazonian scrub flycatcher is found in South America in its natural habitats of subtropical or tropical dry forests and subtropical or tropical moist lowland forests. Generation length is 3.6 years. They are found in more mesic habitats than those preferred by congeners.

Population 
The population of S. obscurior is evaluated as stable on the IUCN red list of threatened species. The Amazonian scrub flycatcher also had no severe population fluctuations.

Diet and Foraging 
The diet of the Amazonian scrub flycatcher consists of Arthropods and also small berries. While they forage for food, the Amazonian scrub flycatcher discreetly peers from small trees and shrubs, perching vertically with their tail downwards. The bird uses the gleaning method or makes short sallies from a perch to catch their prey.

Vocal Behavior 
The Amazonian scrub flycatcher can be detected by its repetitive two-part whistle. They make loud sounds that contain 2-3 syllables, “ch-we-deé ch-we-deé chu-weeé.”

Conservation 
These birds are not globally threatened. Amazonian scrub flycatchers have an extremely large range and are categorized as Least Concern. Although they are rare and uncommon to find, they are found in La Selva Lodge, in Ecuador, Tambopata-Candamo Reserved Zone, in Peru, and Madidi National Park, in Bolivia.

Breeding 
Amazonian scrub flycatchers from Ecuador will have more adamant song and enlarged testes during the month of July and will begin nest-building eight meters above the ground later in July. Amazonian scrub flycatchers in Guyana will start the breeding process in May and will start nest building later in the month of May.

References

External links
Species Article-(abbreviated) mangoverde

Amazonian scrub flycatcher
Birds of the Amazon Basin
Birds of the Guianas
Amazonian scrub flycatcher
Amazonian scrub flycatcher
Birds of Brazil
Taxonomy articles created by Polbot